Gitanjali Senior School was established by Mrs Gita Karan and Mr Uma Karan in June 1990 in Hyderabad, Begumpet, India. The school has a primary school in Brahman Wadi, a kilometer away. Gitanjali Senior School has secured many national ranks in surveys and was ranked the third-best school in South India and the best in Andhra Pradesh in a survey conducted by Education World Magazine.

The school has grades from classes 7 to 10 of Indian Certificate of Secondary Education and checkpoint and IGCSE. It also offers A-Level and ISC Boards for class 11 and 12.

Facilities 
The school has a playground, cricket nets, and a basketball ground. The computer lab has around 25 computers, with a separate computer lab for the ISC students. The school houses four auditoriums out of which one is exclusively for conducting the annual Board Examinations. It has a Biology Laboratory, a Physics Laboratory, and a Chemistry Laboratory. The school library has over 500 books, ranging from reference material to fiction.

Events
For the first time, the institution hosted its MUN in 2015, attended by students from twin cities. The school also hosts a Sports Day and Investiture Ceremony and an Annual Day every year. It hosts Festanjali, the annual Inter-house fest for school students with literary events such as debate, elocution, and poetry. The sports events include cricket, football, basketball, kho-kho, and athletics. These are hosted under the category of Inter-House Events. An annual volleyball tournament is also held for the teachers.

Results 
The results of the school have been excellent with the students securing at least one of the top ranks in the state. A student of the 2012-13 batch had a 97% and topped the state in the ICSE board exam. 2013-2014 saw one of the best results of school with the school highest touching a whopping 98% (588/600) and 42 students scoring more than 90% (i.e. more than. 540/600). In 2015, the school scaled the highest of 97.7% in ICSE.

Rankings 

With a strong academic reputation, Gitanjali School is considered to be among the best co-educational day schools in India.

Since 2008, Education World has consistently ranked Gitanjali as the best school in Hyderabad and among the top 10 day-schools in the country, with a peak national ranking of 7.

In 2018, Education Today ranked Gitanjali School at 6th among Top ICSE Schools in India. Under the Academic Reputation category, Gitanjali was ranked 3rd in the country.

Quizzing 
The school has performed well at quizzes including quizzes such as AP Regional ICSE - ISC quiz, The Young World Quiz and The Times NIE quiz 2013 and runners up in 2014. It has won the TCS IT Wiz hosted by Greycaps in July 2013. It has also won the RBI Quiz of 2013, proceeding to win the regional semi-finals too, finishing runners up in the city rounds in 2014. The school is the winner of the All India ISC Quiz at the National Level, 2013, organised by CISCE. The school also won Horlicks WizKids WizQuiz in 2014, finishing runners up in 2013. Other quizzes where the students have accomplished include K-Circle and Cycle Heritage Quiz.

It also won the Horlicks WizQuiz in 2015 and one of their teams also bagged the 2nd position of the same.

It was also the national champions of the ASISC Annual Interschool Quiz, 2016.

Annual Day 2022 
The annual day of 2022 was held at November 4 in Hari Hara Kala bhavan. The last annua day was held at 2018 n the same place.

References

Schools in Hyderabad, India
Educational institutions established in 1990
1990 establishments in Andhra Pradesh